HMS Union was a 98-gun second-rate ship of the line of the Royal Navy, launched on 16 November 1811 at Plymouth.

She was broken up in 1833.

Notes

References

Lavery, Brian (2003) The Ship of the Line - Volume 1: The development of the battlefleet 1650-1850. Conway Maritime Press. .

External links
 

Ships of the line of the Royal Navy
Boyne-class ships of the line (1810)
1811 ships